The Speed Freak Killers is the name given to serial killer duo Loren Herzog and Wesley Shermantine, together initially convicted of four murders — three jointly — in and around San Joaquin County, California. They received the "speed freak" moniker due to their methamphetamine abuse.

Herzog committed suicide in 2012.  Shermantine remains on death row in San Quentin State Prison, in San Quentin, California.

Investigation

Herzog and Shermantine grew up as childhood friends in the town of Linden, California. The citizens of Linden, a small town with fewer than 2,000 people, 95 miles east of San Francisco, were long aware of the duo's reputation as methamphetamine users. They were regulars at the Linden Inn, a bar owned by the father of 25-year-old Cyndi Vanderheiden of Clements, California. Vanderheiden went missing after leaving the Linden Inn with Herzog and Shermantine on November 14, 1998.

Investigation into Vanderheiden's disappearance continued into 1999, and Shermantine was the prime suspect. In mid-January 1999, Shermantine's car was repossessed and was subsequently searched by the San Joaquin Sheriff's Department. Blood from Cyndi Vanderheiden was discovered in the car, and while DNA test results were being confirmed, the sheriff's department focused on Loren Herzog, Shermantine's friend and suspected accomplice. He was extensively questioned.

Herzog described how Shermantine shot a hunter they ran into while on vacation in Utah in 1994. Utah police confirmed that a hunter was killed, but his murder was still classified as unsolved. Herzog also said Shermantine was responsible for killing Henry Howell, who was found parked off the road on Highway 88 in Alpine County with his teeth and head bashed in. Herzog said he and Shermantine passed Howell parked on the highway, and Shermantine stopped, grabbed Howell's shotgun, killed him, and stole what little money he had. Additionally, Herzog gave specific details about how Shermantine killed Robin Armtrout.

Herzog and Shermantine were arrested by the San Joaquin County Sheriff's Department and charged with several counts of murder each in March 1999.

2001 convictions 
In 2001, a jury found Shermantine guilty of four murders: those of Vanderheiden, Howard King, and Paul Cavanaugh – each shot dead in his car in 1984, and 16-year-old Chevelle "Chevy" Wheeler, who disappeared in 1985 from Franklin High School in Stockton after telling friends, she was leaving school to go with Shermantine to his family's cabin in San Andreas. Shermantine was sentenced to death and is on death row at San Quentin State Prison.

Herzog was charged with five counts of murder in 1999: that of Cyndi Vanderheiden, Henry Howell, Paul Raymond Cavanaugh, Howard Michael King III, and Roberta "Robin" Ray Armtrout. In his 2001 trial, a jury found him guilty on three murder counts (Vanderheiden, Cavanaugh, and King), the lesser charge of accessory to murder in the Howell count, and acquitted him on the Armtrout count. Herzog was given a 78-year sentence.

Appeals and overturned convictions 
An appeals court overturned all of Herzog's convictions in August 2004, ruling that three of Herzog's four confessions were coerced. In the case of the fourth, that of Cyndi Vanderheiden, a retrial was ordered. This retrial never took place. Rather, a plea bargain was reached, and Herzog pleaded guilty to voluntary manslaughter and furnishing amphetamine in the Vanderheiden case and to being an accessory to murder in the Cavanaugh, King, and Howell cases. Accordingly, Herzog's sentence was reduced to 14 years, with credit for six years served. With credit off his sentence for good behavior, Herzog served 11 years in prison and was in a position to be paroled by 2010.

Opposition to the inevitability of Herzog's parole was extremely vocal, especially from victims' families. That no California county wanted to take him for parole led the California Department of Corrections to parole him to a trailer stationed outside the front gate of the High Desert State Prison in Susanville, California in Lassen County in September 2010.

Herzog committed suicide in January 2012, hanging himself inside his trailer. He did so shortly after bounty hunter Leonard Padilla informed Herzog that Shermantine was planning to disclose the location of a well and two other locations where the duo buried their victims. Previously, none of their victims' bodies had been found. Both men maintained that the other did the killing in all cases.

Discovery of victims' remains

Linden, California well 
In February 2010, while Wesley Shermantine waited on death row, his sister Barbara received letters from him identifying the locations of victims in an abandoned well on Flood Road near Linden, California. She turned these letters over to the San Joaquin County Sheriff's Department. The Sheriff's Department followed up on the lead, but in an interview with the property owner, the owner stated that the wells in question were sealed before the victims disappeared. No further action was taken at that time.

More came out in February 2012, based on bounty hunter Leonard Padilla's promise to pay Shermantine $30,000 for information. A map drawn by Shermantine and additional information given again led authorities to the same Linden, California well site he mentioned in 2010. More than 1,000 human bone fragments were recovered. The bones were to be tested by the California Department of Justice for DNA profiling. In March 2012, the FBI's Evidence Recovery Team was asked to assist with the overall investigation, in part because of how the excavation of the Linden well was handled.

The identity of the remains recovered in the well was announced to the public on March 30, 2012. They were those of two Stockton, California teens missing since the mid-1980s: Kimberly Ann Billy, 19, who disappeared December 11, 1984, and Joann Hobson, 16, who disappeared August 29, 1985. The remains of an additional victim and an unidentified fetus were found in the well.

Former Shermantine property 
Two separate burial sites in Calaveras County, California were also investigated in February 2012 based on a letter Shermantine wrote to Padilla that detailed possible locations of victims. Shermantine indicated sites near property formerly owned by Shermantine's parents. Bodies from these two sites were recovered and identified as those of Chevelle "Chevy" Wheeler and Cyndi Vanderheiden.

September 2012 burial sites 
Shermantine was briefly released from death row into police custody in September 2012 to lead authorities to four additional abandoned wells where he stated more victim remains would be found, all near the town of Linden, done because Leonard Padilla paid him $28,000. In early January 2013, the FBI began excavating a well site, which they hoped would yield more victims' remains. Shermantine declined to speak further to authorities. On February 22, 2013, the FBI announced that it had ended the search for victims based on Shermantine's information. Two sites he had indicated had turned up nothing, and "other directions from him were misguided".

Shermantine also claimed to know the locations in the Cow Mountain Recreation Area of bodies of victims killed by other death row inmates. Lake County sheriffs were skeptical that any bodies could be successfully recovered in the large park.

Allegations of investigation-hampering
Since 2012, several victims' families and elected officials have alleged that the San Joaquin County Sheriff's Office (SJCSO) interfered with and deliberately hampered the continued search for additional possible victims of the "Speed Freak Killers."

In 2010, Shermantine wrote a letter to California State Senator Cathleen Galgiani—whose cousin, 19-year-old Dena McHan, disappeared in 1981—revealing the locations of the remains of additional victims. In 2012, Galgiani sponsored the use of taxpayer funds to search for additional victims of the pair and sought to simplify protocol granting incarcerated persons like Shermantine permission to participate in search excursions. Galgiani turned the letter over to law enforcement and later alleged that missing person records related to the "Speed Freak Killers" case had been deleted, hampering the further investigation.

In 2014, the mother of a missing woman filed suit against the SJCSO for mishandling the remains found in the Linden well. In 2015, a retired FBI agent corroborated her claims, alleging that the SJCSO deliberately used a backhoe to dig up remains, mangling them to prevent identification, so that the absence of certain files would not be discovered.

In 2018, the Sheriff-elect of San Joaquin County announced that the "Speed Freak Killers" case would be re-opened.

Connection to Garecht disappearance

In August 2012, Shermantine wrote a letter to The Stockton Record after Herzog committed suicide in January 2012, in which he pointed out that Herzog bore a resemblance to the composite of the person who kidnapped "that Hayward girl." Commenting on the likeness Herzog bore to Garecht's kidnapper, witness Katrina Rodriguez commented: "I thought then and I think now he could be the kidnapper...  I think there are features that look very much like the man...It seems like a strong lead."

At Shermantine's direction, law enforcement began excavating an abandoned well in rural Linden, California in February 2012, where Herzog and Shermantine disposed of their victims. Thousands of bone fragments belonging to five different individuals were recovered from the well, some of which were believed to potentially belong to Garecht. However, DNA profiling completed later that year excluded Garecht as a possibility; the bones believed to have been hers were determined to be those of 19-year-old Kimberly Billy, who had disappeared in 1984. In January 2013, further excavations of abandoned wells in the area were completed, but yielded no further remains.

In 2015, a legal motion was filed by attorney Mark Geragos on behalf of a detective who was informed by a San Joaquin sheriff's deputy that a pair of Mary Jane shoes discovered in one of the Linden wells bore similarity to the shoes Garecht was last seen wearing. According to the detective, San Joaquin police refused to show him the shoes, both physically as well in photographs, and, as of March 2015, the shoes had not been examined by the Hayward Police Department.

In December 2020, David Misch was arrested for Garecht's murder.

In popular media 
This case was featured on episode 178 of the series American Justice, "Vanished", which first aired September 4, 2002. With the episode's 2002 production date, newer details relating to this case were not a part of the program. Two of the victims' families (the Wheelers and Vanderheidens) did not yet know where their daughters' bodies were, and Herzog was (still) serving a 78-year sentence.

In 2013, popular British true crime television program Born to Kill? made an episode about the deadly duo.

The story was covered on the 2015 episode “Where Evil Lives”, on the crime documentary series On the Case with Paula Zahn. The episode included updates on Herzog’s release and suicide, and the discovery of victims’ remains, including Wheeler and Vanderheiden—with comments from Wheeler‘s and Vanderheiden’s families.

In 2022, a Parcast production titled ‘Serial Killers’ chronicled the murders and lives of both Herzog and Shermantine in an episode titled ‘Speed Freak Killers’.

See also 
 List of serial killers in the United States
 List of serial killers by number of victims

References

External links
"The Speed Freak Killers", extensive reportage by Gary C. King, TruTV site

2001 in California
2012 in California
20th-century American criminals
American male criminals
American murderers of children
American people convicted of murder
American serial killers
Criminal duos
Criminals from California
Male serial killers
Methamphetamine in the United States
People convicted of murder by California
People from Linden, California